This is a list of what are intended to be the notable top hotels by country, five or four star hotels, notable skyscraper landmarks or historic hotels which are covered in multiple reliable publications. It should not be a directory of every hotel in every country:

Laos

 Amantaka, Luang Prabang
Ban Pako
 Don Chan Palace, Vientiane
 Green Park Boutique Hotel, Vientiane
 Hotel Beau Rivage Mekong, Vientiane
 Lao Plaza Hotel, Vientiane
 Royal Dokmaideng Hotel, Vientiane
 Settha Palace Hotel, Vientiane

Latvia
 Gallery Park Hotel, Riga, Riga
 Grand Palace Hotel, Riga

Lebanon

 Beirut Marriott Hotel, Beirut
 Chtaura Park Hotel, Bekaa
 Crowne Plaza Hotel, Beirut
 InterContinental Phoenicia Beirut Hotel, Beirut
 Le Vendôme Intercontinental Hotel, Beirut
 Metropolitan Palace Hotel, Beirut
 Safir Helipolitan Hotel, Beirut

Liberia
Ducor Intercontinental Hotel, Monrovia
Hotel Africa, Victoria, near Monrovia

Libya

 Corinthia Hotel Tripoli, Tripoli
 Grand Hotel Tripoli, Tripoli
 Hotel Al Mehari, Tripoli
 Hotel Casinò Uaddan, Tripoli
 Hotel Tobruk, Tobruk
 Tibesti Hotel, Benghazi
 Uzu Hotel, Benghazi

References

L